Liocleonus clathratus is a species of cylindrical weevils belonging to the family Curculionidae.

Description 
The body is elongated and the basic coloration is white, with longitudinal black markings on the pronotum and elytrae. These weevils are considered a serious pest. They attacks several Tamarix species, especially Tamarix ramosissima, Tamarix parviflora and Tamarix gallica . Larvae develop in huge galls on the roots and at the base of young rods of the host plants. These gall-maker weevils can be found mainly in April.

Distribution 
This species is widespread in the eastern Palearctic realm, in the Near East, and in North Africa.

References 

 Biolib
 Fauna Europaea
 Advances in Holocene Palaeoecology in Bulgaria
 University of Delaware

Lixinae
Beetles described in 1807